Mawk can refer to:

Mike's AWK, an interpreter for the AWK programming language
Mark "Mawk" Young, the former bassist for the band Hed PE